Yoav Kisch (born 6 December 1968) is an Israeli pilot and politician. He has served as a member of the Knesset for Likud since 2015, and as Minister of Education and Minister of Regional Cooperation since December 2022.

Biography
Kisch was born and raised in Tel Aviv. His paternal grandfather was Frederick Kisch, the highest-ranking Jew ever to serve in the British Army. Through his mother, he is a descendant of Shmuel Salant, who served as Ashkenazi Chief Rabbi of Jerusalem in the 19th century. Kisch held British citizenship until having to renounce it in 2015 as a condition of being allowed to take up a seat in the Knesset. He holds an MBA from INSEAD. He was on the Likud Yisrael Beiteinu list for the 2013 Knesset elections, but failed to win a seat.

Prior to the 2015 elections he was placed 19th on the Likud list, a slot reserved for the Tel Aviv region. He was elected to the Knesset when Likud won 30 seats.

Kisch is married with three children and lives in Ramat Gan.

References

External links

1968 births
Living people
Deputy ministers of Israel
INSEAD alumni
Israeli aviators
Israeli people of British-Jewish descent
Jewish Israeli politicians
Likud politicians
Members of the 20th Knesset (2015–2019)
Members of the 21st Knesset (2019)
Members of the 22nd Knesset (2019–2020)
Members of the 23rd Knesset (2020–2021)
Members of the 24th Knesset (2021–2022)
Members of the 25th Knesset (2022–)
People from Tel Aviv
People who lost British citizenship
Ministers of Education of Israel